Parliamentary elections were held in Andorra on 9 December 1981, with a second round of voting on 16 December. Local elections were held on the same day.  Following the elections, Òscar Ribas Reig became the country's first Prime Minister.

Electoral system
For the first time, all 28 seats of the General Council were up for election at the same time. Between 1867 and 1979 only half of the seats were renewed in each election.

Each parish formed a constituency, electing four members each. Members of the Parliament were elected using a two-round plurality voting system. As political parties were not legalised until 1993, all candidates ran as independents.

Following the election, the General Council elected the Prime Minister of Andorra, and the General Syndic (speaker).

Results
Voter turnout was 74.5%. A second round was only held in Canillo to elect two vacant seats not filled in the first round.

References

Andorra
Parliamentary election
Parliamentary elections in Andorra
Non-partisan elections
December 1981 events in Europe
Election and referendum articles with incomplete results